Len Carter (7 December 1934 – 12 July 2006) was an  Australian rules footballer who played with Hawthorn in the Victorian Football League (VFL).

Carter was recruited from Strathmerton in the Murray Football League (MFL), after winning the 1956 MFL premiership and the O'Dwyer Medal.

Notes

External links 

1934 births
2006 deaths
Australian rules footballers from Victoria (Australia)
Hawthorn Football Club players